Jacobaea is a genus of flowering plants in the tribe Senecioneae and the family Asteraceae. Its members used to be placed in the genus Senecio, but have been separated into the segregate genus Jacobaea on the basis of molecular phylogenetics in order to maintain genera that are monophyletic.

Species
The following species are recognised by The Plant List:

Jacobaea abrotanifolia (L.) Moench
Jacobaea adonidifolia (Loisel.) Pelser & Veldkamp
Jacobaea alpina (L.) Moench
Jacobaea ambigua (Biv.) Pelser & Veldkamp
Jacobaea andrzejowskyi (Tzvelev) B.Nord. & Greuter
Jacobaea aquatica (Hill) G.Gaertn., B.Mey. & Scherb.
Jacobaea argunensis (Turcz.) B.Nord.
Jacobaea arnautorum (Velen.) Pelser
Jacobaea auricula (Bourg. ex Coss.) Pelser
Jacobaea boissieri (DC.) Pelser
Jacobaea borysthenica (DC.) B.Nord. & Greuter
Jacobaea buschiana (Sosn.) B.Nord. & Greuter
Jacobaea candida (C.Presl) B.Nord. & Greuter
Jacobaea cannabifolia (Less.) E.Wiebe
Jacobaea cilicia (Boiss.) B.Nord.
Jacobaea delphiniifolia (Vahl) Pelser & Veldkamp
Jacobaea erratica (Bertol.) Fourr.
Jacobaea erucifolia (L.) P.Gaertn., B.Mey. & Schreb.
Jacobaea ferganensis (Schischk.) B.Nord. & Greuter
Jacobaea gallerandiana (Coss. & Durieu) Pelser
Jacobaea gibbosa (Guss.) B.Nord. & Greuter
Jacobaea gigantea (Desf.) Pelser
Jacobaea gnaphalioides (Sieber ex Spreng.) Veldkamp
Jacobaea incana (L.) Veldkamp
Jacobaea inops (Boiss. & Balansa) B.Nord.
Jacobaea leucophylla (DC.) Pelser
Jacobaea lycopifolia (Poir.) Greuter & B.Nord.
Jacobaea maritima (L.) Pelser & Meijden
Jacobaea maroccana (P.H.Davis) Pelser
Jacobaea minuta (Cav.) Pelser & Veldkamp
Jacobaea mollis (Willd.) B.Nord.
Jacobaea mouterdei (Arènes) Greuter & B.Nord.
Jacobaea ornata (Druce) Greuter & B.Nord.
Jacobaea othonnae (M.Bieb.) C.A.Mey.
Jacobaea paludosa (L.) G.Gaertn., B.Mey. & Scherb.
Jacobaea persoonii (De Not.) Pelser
Jacobaea samnitum (Nyman) B.Nord. & Greuter
Jacobaea sandrasica (P.H.Davis) B.Nord. & Greuter
Jacobaea schischkiniana (Sofieva) B.Nord. & Greuter
Jacobaea subalpina (W.D.J.Koch) Pelser & Veldkamp
Jacobaea trapezuntina (Boiss.) B.Nord.
Jacobaea uniflora (All.) Veldkamp
Jacobaea vulgaris Gaertn.

The following additional species are accepted by Plants of The World Online:

Jacobaea acutipinna (Hand.-Mazz.) Sennikov
Jacobaea ambracea (Turcz. ex DC.) B.Nord.
Jacobaea analoga (DC.) Veldkamp
Jacobaea chassanica (Barkalov) A.E.Kozhevn.
Jacobaea carniolica (Willd.) Schrank
Jacobaea disjuncta (Flatscher, Schneew. & Schönsw.) Galasso & Bartolucci
Jacobaea echaeta (Y.L.Chen & K.Y.Pan) B.Nord.
Jacobaea graciliflora (DC.) Sennikov
Jacobaea grandidentata (Ledeb.) Vasjukov
Jacobaea insubrica (Chenevard) Galasso & Bartolucci
Jacobaea korshinskyi (Krasch.) B.Nord.
Jacobaea kuanshanensis (C.I Peng & S.W.Chung) S.S.Ying
Jacobaea litvinovii (Schischk.) Zuev
Jacobaea morrisonensis  (Hayata) S.S.Ying
Jacobaea multibracteolata (C.Jeffrey & Y.L.Chen) B.Nord.
Jacobaea norica (Flatscher, Schneew. & Schönsw.) Galasso & Bartolucci
Jacobaea nudicaulis (Buch.-Ham. ex D.Don) B.Nord.
Jacobaea pancicii (Degen) Vladimir. & Raab-Straube
Jacobaea pseudoarnica (Less.) Zuev
Jacobaea racemosa (M.Bieb.) Pelser
Jacobaea raphanifolia (Wall. ex DC.) B.Nord.
Jacobaea renardii (C.Winkl.) B.Nord.
Jacobaea schwetzowii (Korsh.) Tatanov & Vasjukov
Jacobaea tarokoensis (C.I Peng) S.S.Ying
Jacobaea taurica (Konechn.) Mosyakin & Yena
Jacobaea thuretii (Briq. & Cavill.) B.Bock
Jacobaea tibetica (Hook.f.) B.Nord.

References

External links

 
Taxa named by Philip Miller
Asteraceae genera